Xiaohui Fan (born 9 December 1971 in Beijing, China) is an American astronomer, and full professor at University of Arizona. He is widely known for his studies on quasars, extremely bright supermassive black holes, detected primarily at high redshift. In 2003, Fan was named to Popular Science magazine's annual Brilliant Ten list for developing methods to investigate distant quasars. Since 2001, he was a pioneer in the detection and discovery of high-redshift quasars, introducing new techniques and practically inventing the field. Using these quasars, he has shown that supermassive black holes with masses up to 10 million solar masses existed within one billion years after the big bang. In 2019, he led an international team of astronomers that discovered the farthest lensed quasar thus far, the very first in the epoch of reionization. In 2021, his team announced the discovery of the most distant and oldest known quasar, J0313-1806.

Education 
He graduated from Nanjing University with a B.Sc. (1992) and from the Chinese Academy of Sciences with a M.Sc. (1995). He received his Ph.D. from Princeton University in 2000.

Awards
2003 Newton Lacy Pierce Prize in Astronomy, from the American Astronomical Society
2008 Guggenheim Fellowship
2003 Alfred P. Sloan Research Fellowship
2004 David and Lucile Packard Fellowship in Science and Engineering

References

External links
Astronomer's website
"Fan Xiaohui", Scientific Commons

American astronomers
Educators from Beijing
1971 births
Chinese expatriates in the United States
Princeton University alumni
University of Arizona faculty
Nanjing University alumni
Living people